Olching Bird Park is located in Olching, 20 km north west of Munich. On an area of 20,000 m2, a wide range of different species can be found: from the little tiger finch to cranes, storks and many brightly coloured parrots.

The amazing area of the so-called Amper river is a particular feature that distinguishes the park from others. All aviaries have natural plants which underline the naturalness of the park. A main objective of the park association is the breeding of native birds and a large zone is defined as a retreat for the local wildlife.

For the visitors there is also a typical Bavarian beer garden in the park as well as a playground for younger guests. The operator of the bird park is the Bird Lover's Association of Olching.

History  
The Bird Association of Olching was founded in 1968 and has 120 members. AT the beginning the area was privately used - only by the birders for their ever-growing collection. In 1982 the park was opened to the public. 
Dogs are permitted. Guided tours may be arranged on request.

External links
Vogelpark (BirdPark) Olching official site

Protected areas of Bavaria
Parks in Germany
Tourist attractions in Bavaria
Aviaries
Zoos in Germany